Jamboree is a 1944 American comedy film directed by Joseph Santley and written by Jack Townley. The film stars Ruth Terry, George Byron, Paul Harvey, Edwin Stanley, Freddie Fisher and Ernest Tubb. The film was released on May 5, 1944, by Republic Pictures.

Plot

Cast  
Ruth Terry as Ruth Cartwright
George Byron as Joe Mason
Paul Harvey as P.J. Jarvis
Edwin Stanley as Sam Smith
Freddie Fisher as Freddie Fisher
Freddie Fisher's Schnicklefritz Band as Harmonica Band 
Ernest Tubb as Ernest Tubb
Ernest Tubb's Texas Troubadours as Ernest Tubb Band
The Music Maids as Singing Trio 
Don Wilson as Don Wilson
Isabel Randolph as Mrs. Abigail Uppington
Rufe Davis as Rufe Davis
Shirley Mitchell as Alice Darling
Shug Fisher as George 'Shug' Fisher

References

External links 
 

1944 films
1940s English-language films
American comedy films
1944 comedy films
Republic Pictures films
Films directed by Joseph Santley
American black-and-white films
1940s American films